A camisole, often shortened to cami, is a woman's undergarment which covers the top part of the body.

Cami or CAMI may also refer to:

 Cami Dalton (21st century), American romance novelist
 Nicolas Camí (born 1981), French footballer
 Cami Lake, on the main island of the Tierra del Fuego archipelago, shared by Argentina and Chile
 Civil Aerospace Medical Institute, part of the United States government
 CAMI Automotive, a Canadian automobile manufacturing company
 Columbia Artists Management, a talent management agency